Soldier Township is a township in Crawford County, Iowa, USA.  As of the 2000 census, its population was 323.

Geography

The stream of Beaver Creek runs through this township.

References
 USGS Geographic Names Information System (GNIS)

External links
 US-Counties.com
 City-Data.com

Townships in Crawford County, Iowa
Townships in Iowa